Minervino may refer to :

 Places and jurisdictions, in Apulia, southeastern Italy 
 Minervino di Lecce
 Minervino Murge, formerly seat of the
 Diocese of Minervino, now a Latin Catholic titular see as Minervino Murge

 Persons (first name) 
 Minervino González, Spanish Olympic sports shooter
 Minervino Pietra, Portuguese football (soccer) player